Aakera is a village situated in Rewari district, India.

Demographics
As of 2011 India census, Aakera had a population of 7110 in 1778 households. Males (4143) constitute 58.27%  of the population and females (2967) 41.72%. Aakera has an average literacy (4913) rate of 69.09%, lower than the national average of 74%: male literacy (3199) is 65.11%, and female literacy (1714) is 34.88% of total literates (4913). In Aakera, 16.01% of the population is under 6 years of age (1139).

Aakera in other Districts
Similarly Aakera is in Rajasthan and two places of Haryana as under
State- Haryana, District- Rewari, SubDistrict-Rewari, Village Name- Aakera (292) (CT)(062658) TOWN  Aakera (292) (CT) It has two 'Aa' as a prefix.
State- Haryana, District-Mewat, SubDistrict-Nuh, Village Name- Akera (121)(063168) VILLAGE  Akera (121) It has only one 'a' as a prefix.
State- Rajasthan, District- Baran, SubDistrict- Baran, Village Name- Akera (102789) It has only one 'a' as a prefix.

Adjacent villages
Kapriwas
Khijuriwas
Bhiwadi town
Dharuhera town
Nikhri Village
Rasgan
Dungarwas
Jaunawas (Jonawas)
Raliawas

References 

Villages in Rewari district